In June 2010 Wales toured New Zealand in a two-test series. First in Dunedin, then in Hamilton. Before the series, New Zealand sat first in the World Rankings, while Wales sat at eighth. At the conclusion of the series, Wales dropped below Argentina, to ninth.

Fixtures

Matches

First test

Second test

Squads

New Zealand

Wales

Extended squad

References

2010 rugby union tours
2009–10 in Welsh rugby union
2010 in New Zealand rugby union
2010
2010
History of rugby union matches between New Zealand and Wales